Dublin High School is a four-year high school located in the East San Francisco Bay Area. It is the only currently operating high school in the Dublin Unified School District—as another high school in the city has yet to be constructed and operational—and serves about 3,500 students.

Dublin High has been selected a California Distinguished School five times since 1990 (1990, 1992, 1996, 2003, and 2017). It has a California Department of Education statewide rank of 10 (out of 10) and a similar schools rank of 10 (out of 10). In August 2015, Dublin High School was notified of inclusion in Newsweeks 2015 List of America's Top Public High Schools (ranked #165, the top ranked Tri-Valley high school). It was also awarded a Silver Medal in the 2015 U.S. News & World Report ranking of high schools.

History
By the peak of the California Gold Rush in the 1850s, Dublin had established itself as a significant crossroads city in the San Francisco Bay Area. The Murray School District, consisting of the quaint Murray School, was established in 1866 to meet the educational needs of an ever-increasing population. This proved satisfactory until the late 1950s after World War II, when real estate developers chose Dublin as a site for large-scale suburban development. The population subsequently skyrocketed, from 750 to 13,641 by 1970.

The city scrambled to expand the school system, opening and closing several schools within the next few decades. Dublin High School was established amidst this process in 1968—first as the second high school in Pleasanton, California. The school opened in 1969 and graduated its first senior class in June 1971. After the incorporation of the City of Dublin in 1982, Dublin High combined with the Murray School District to form the Dublin Unified School District in July 1988.

It was around this time that Dublin High School adopted the Gael, the mascot of Saint Mary's College of California, as its own mascot—as a display of gratitude for the College's donation of athletic gear to the school's athletic department.

Modern issues and renovations 
73.2% of Dublin voters approved a $184 million bond measure in the November 2004 election, which the Dublin Unified School District planned to use in funding various school renovation projects. Dublin High School was the primary beneficiary of the measure, with $120 million dedicated to a complete renewal of the campus (which began in 2008 and was completed in 2015).  The renewal included a new 500-seat Center for Performing Arts and Education, a modernization of the 1968 gymnasium, and a new courtyard.

Over time, this too proved insufficient. Dublin's population continued to drastically increase in the 21st century, reaching a total of 46,036 by the year 2010. By 2015, the Dublin Unified School District outlined a second comprehensive high school as one of its top priorities—as listed in its Facilities Master Plan—citing a survey showing Dublin High faculty members' desires for additional classrooms and renovations of old facilities. By September 2020, plans to build and open the new Emerald High School were finalized.

Dublin voters also passed another $99 million bond measure in 2012 to fund the construction of a 47,000 sq. ft. Science and Engineering Building, which was completed in April 2021.

In the meantime, 2017 saw a beginning of protest and outcry from Dublin High teachers, who had struggled with increased class sizes without proper staffing accommodation or financial compensation. As negotiations for appropriate pay raises and contractual improvements stagnated for months, members and supporters of the Dublin Teachers Association (DTA) took to the streets in a candlelight march to the District office, culminating in a series of statements at the ongoing School Board meeting. This was the first of several marches which took place within the next couple years. In March 2019, the DTA threatened to go on strike if negotiations remained stagnant; a tentative agreement including a pay raise and class size limitation was reached in April.

Response to the COVID-19 pandemic 
This section tracks the response of Dublin High School and the Dublin Unified School District (DUSD) to the ongoing COVID-19 pandemic.

2019-2020 school year 
On March 9, 2020, all DUSD teachers were instructed to create a two week emergency plan in case school is closed due to COVID-19.
On March 10, 2020, the DUSD held an Emergency School Board Meeting to discuss ramifications and responses to the COVID-19 pandemic. 
On March 13, 2020, DUSD issued a statement announcing temporary closure of all school sites until April 13, 2020. 
On March 25, 2020, Alameda County Board of Education suggested an extension to the initial 4-week closure, with the new end date now May 1, 2020. 
On April 1, 2020, DUSD determined it would extend the closure indefinitely.

2020-2021 school year 
The 2020-2021 school year saw a cautious but steady return to normalcy. The Dublin City Schools Board of Education sought to rectify the chaos of the previous spring semester, launching their 2020-21 Responsible Restart Plan in late July 2020. The Responsible Restart Plan was a step-by-step procedure the Board intended to follow--from distance learning in the fall, to ultimately returning to "full-in" (all in-person instruction) by March 15, 2021. As the pandemic worsened, the initial plan proved difficult to follow as precisely as the Board had hoped: the hybrid learning model, scheduled to be implemented on September 8, 2020, finally began on January 11, 2021.
Full in-person instruction was never achieved within the school year; but as summer neared, and COVID-19 cases dwindled significantly in number, the graduation ceremony for the Class of 2021 was successfully held in-person at the Gaels Stadium, the school's multi-purpose outdoor stadium, on May 28, 2021.

2021-2022 school year 
While uncertainties remain due to stagnating vaccination rates and new COVID-19 variants, Dublin High School plans to return to full in-person instruction, the only difference from pre-COVID instruction being a renewed masking policy in accordance with CDC guidelines.

Academics 
Dublin High is home to select Academies focusing on specific career paths:

Health Science and Medical Technology Academy 
Dublin High School offers the unique opportunity for students to gain lab and practical experience in the biomedical field. Students interested in the Pre-Med Track may join the Health Science and Medical Technology Academy, more commonly known as the Biomedical Academy. The academy starts accepting students at the end of 8th grade; selective interviews are held to determine placement. The academy offers classes focused on the intersection between biology and medicine, with an emphasis on lab skills. The academy is closely affiliated with the school's HOSA club and offers a mentorship program in the eleventh grade to further career development.

Engineering and Design Academy 
Students also have the opportunity to pursue engineering via the Engineering and Design Academy. This exclusive academy allows students to network with industry professionals and get priority to take a variety of engineering classes. In 2021, a brand new three-floor Science and Engineering finished construction, allowing for expansion of the Academy as well as general classes.

Culinary Academy 
There is also a Culinary academy on campus for students eager to pursue this route. In this academy the main course is Catering, a course that actually caters to venues such as weddings and dinners. Those who take part in the culinary academy for 3 years receive a scholarship of a few hundred dollars upon graduation.

Performing Arts Programs 
Dublin High School offers a diverse array of performing arts programs. The Irish Guard Marching Band and Color Guard competes in the Western Band Association (WBA) and Northern California Band Association (NCBA) in the AAAAA Division and has a membership of 147 students as of 2017. For over 40 years, the Irish Guard has performed at field show competitions, home football and basketball games, concerts, and community events. The marching band, and off-season concert and jazz bands, have performed in Hawaii, Disney World, Canada, Ireland and Carnegie Hall, among others. The Concert Band performed at Symphony Center in Chicago in April 2014. In March 2016, the marching band travelled to Ireland to perform in the annual Saint Patrick's Day parade in Bray. The Director of Bands at Dublin High School is Elliot Polot. Another program that the High school provides is the 'String Orchestra' which the Director of Bands leads.

Dublin High also hosts an active Drama department, which offers extensive courses and clubs that culminate in fall plays, spring musicals, student-directed One Acts, and attendance at the annual Lenaea High School Theatre Festival in Folsom, California.

The ARC 
The ARC or Academic & Resource Center serves as the tutoring center, providing access to technology (through Chromebooks), printers, textbooks, school supplies, and one-on-one assistance with curricula. It is located on the second floor of the Science and Engineering Building.

On-campus resources

Freshman Mentor Program 
Created in 2015, the Freshman Mentorship Program (FMP) offers incoming freshmen space and guidance in transitioning from middle school to high school. As of 2017, the Program had 148 student members and 28 faculty advisors.

Career Center 
Frequented especially by upperclassmen starting the college admission process, the Career Center acts as a gateway to college and beyond—presenting scholarship opportunities, processing work permits, and hosting guest speaker events.

Wellness Center 
In 2019, Dublin High opened its Wellness Center in an effort to cater to students' emotional needs and bring further awareness to mental health. Besides general counseling, the Center also offers courses on adulting and smoking prevention, among others.

Transportation 
Dublin High School is served by 3 different bus routes, most of which take students from Dublin High to East Dublin and back. This service is provided by Wheels, an LAVTA bus service.

The school also has two parking lots, one located on Brighton Drive and one on Village Parkway. In 2021, the Village Parkway parking lot was expanded at the old site of the now-defunct Dublin Swim Center.  Student parking is only available to juniors and seniors.

Dublin Partners in Education 
Dublin High students have the option to participate in the Dublin Partners in Education (DPIE) program. The program is most popular for its accelerated summer courses, which earn credit towards high school graduation and allow students to access more advanced courses the following year.

Traditions

Number Hill 
Each year around October, members of the senior class climb to the peak of the San Ramon Ridge Mountain Trailhead before sunrise, then draw the number of their graduating year with large amounts of flour. The hill has been appropriately nicknamed Number Hill.

Rally chants 
The Gael Battle Cry, most often heard at quarterly school-wide rallies, is as follows: “V-I-C-T-O-R-Y, That’s our [grade level] Battle Cry!" (Freshmen, sophomores, juniors, and seniors each take turns chanting the Battle Cry, as a form of light-hearted competition.)

Homecoming 
Dublin High school hosts a homecoming week filled with many traditions often during the month of October. 

 Theme - Every homecoming each grade level selects a theme for the week's activities. They are all led off with the same phrase and each grade level fills in the blank. Examples of the past include “Under the _”
 Spirit Weeks - Typically Homecoming Week is filled with Dress Up days leading up to the big dance. Each grade level competes with one another to get the most spirit points (however no one knows how they are kept track of).
 Skit Night - Every Wednesday during the week of Homecoming students attend a nighttime rally. Each grade level performs a 10 - 15 minute skit surrounding their theme. These skits are often based in humor. At this evening, the Homecoming Prince and Princess for each grade level are crowned.
 Float Decoration - The following Thursday, students assemble a display of their theme near a certain section of the school. Students come before 5AM to commence the building before the 7:45 AM Judging.
 Parade - On the Friday of homecoming week, in conjunction with the Dublin Police Department, the school shuts down Village Parkway, the main road leading to Dublin High. Marching bands and miscellaneous participants from the elementary, middle, and high school levels march down towards the school performing music and choreography.
 Carnival - At the conclusion of the Parade, Students head back to school for the Homecoming Carnival, the most influential fundraiser for DHS clubs. Students can select from the opportunity to play games, eat food, and hangout with friends. Tickets cost $5 but most students elect to volunteer at the fair in exchange for a free entry.
 Football Game - The final event of the week is the Homecoming Football Game. Students Pack Gaels Stadium to watch the JV and Varsity teams hit the gridiron.

Notable events and accolades 

On February 22, 2012, MythBusters stars Adam Savage and Kari Byron participated in a panel session at the Dublin High School Engineering and Design Academy Open House. 1,000 people attended the sold-out event.

Eugene Chou, leader and spearhead of the Engineering Academy, former faculty advisor to the award-winning Gael Force Robotics club, and current advisor of Engineering and Computer Science club, Gael Force Build, won 6th annual Project Lead The Way California Teacher of the Year award on 2 February 2017.

The Dublin Unified School District was recognized by Green Street Scene in 2009 with a Green Building Award for the use of green technology in the renewal of Dublin High School.

Notable alumni

 Chuck Billy, singer for Testament
 Phil Demmel, guitarist for Machine Head
 Droop-E, Bay Area hip-hop producer and rapper
 Alex Cappa, NFL right guard, Tampa Bay Buccaneers, Super Bowl LV
 Robert Jenkins, former NFL left/right tackle and coach for the Los Angeles Rams and Oakland Raiders
 Justin Peelle, NFL tight ends coach, Philadelphia Eagles
 Tim Sbranti, former mayor of Dublin, California
 Eric Swalwell, Congressman, United States House of Representatives, California's 15th congressional district, former candidate in the 2020 Democratic Party presidential primaries
 Ned Yost, manager of the Kansas City Royals
 Tanner Damonte, professional League of Legends player for 100 Thieves
Sam Kless, Vocalist and Creative Director for Just Friends
Noah Mac, contestant and semifinalist on The Voice (American season 13)

References

External links

Dublin High School official website

Educational institutions established in 1968
High schools in Alameda County, California
Public high schools in California
Dublin, California
1968 establishments in California